Chinese Cemetery, also known as Chinese Cemetery, Warren Mining District, is a cemetery located near Warren, Idaho. It is the only ethnic Chinese cemetery in Idaho that is listed on the National Register of Historic Places and was listed on March 29, 1994. The cemetery was created to hold the remains of Chinese migrant laborers who came to Idaho to work as miners, though many of the bodies have since been exhumed and returned to China.

References

External links
 Warren Chinese Cemetery
 

Cemeteries on the National Register of Historic Places in Idaho
Chinese-American history
Chinese cemeteries
Chinese-American culture in Idaho
National Register of Historic Places in Idaho County, Idaho
Payette National Forest